Slovakia is a land-locked country, and therefore the molluscs of Slovakia are all land and freshwater species. There are 247 species of molluscs living in the wild in Slovakia. In addition there are 9 gastropod species living only in greenhouses.

There are a total of 219 species of gastropods, which breaks down to 51 species of freshwater gastropods, and 168 species of land gastropods, plus 28 species of bivalves living in the wild.

There are 8 non-indigenous gastropod species (3 freshwater and 5 land species) and 3 species of bivalves in the wild in Slovakia. This is a total of 6 freshwater non-indigenous species of wild molluscs.

Summary table of number of species

There are 2 extinct species in Slovakia (locally extinct): Theodoxus transversalis and Esperiana esperi.

There are  endemic species of molluscs in Slovakia:
Alzoniella slovenica in Slovakia (and in Moravia in the Czech Republic too)
 Alopia bielzii clathrata (Rossmässler, 1857)
 Deroceras fatrense

History 
Grid distribution maps of all species were made by Lisický (1991).

A faunal list by Čejka et al. (2007) included 245 species. A list by Horsák et al. (2010) included 247 species.

Freshwater gastropods
The list is in zoological order rather than alphabetical order. Freshwater gastropods in the Slovakia include:

Neritidae
 Theodoxus danubialis (C. Pfeiffer, 1828)
 Theodoxus fluviatilis (Linnaeus, 1758) - non-indigenous
 Theodoxus transversalis (C. Pfeiffer, 1828) - extinct

Viviparidae
 Viviparus acerosus (Bourguignat, 1862)
 Viviparus contectus (Millet, 1813)

Thiaridae
 Esperiana daudebartii acicularis (Férussac, 1823) - syn. Microcolpia daudebartii  (Prevost, 1821)
 Esperiana esperi (Férussac, 1823) - extinct

Hydrobiidae
 Potamopyrgus antipodarum (Gray, 1843) - non-indigenous
 Alzoniella slovenica (Ložek & Brtek, 1964) - endemic to Slovakia (and in Moravia in the Czech Republic too), synonyms: Belgrandiella alticola Ložek & Brtek, 1964, Belgrandiella bojnicensis Ložek & Brtek, 1964.

Amnicolidae
 Bythinella austriaca (von Frauenfeld, 1857) s. lat.
 Bythinella hungarica Hazay, 1881
 Bythinella metarubra Falniowski, 1987
 Bythinella pannonica (Frauenfeld, 1865) - synonym: Sadleriana pannonica (Frauenfeld, 1865)
 Bythinella steffeki Grego & Glöer, 2019

Lithoglyphidae
 Lithoglyphus naticoides (C. Pfeiffer, 1828)

Bithyniidae
 Bithynia leachii (Sheppard, 1823)
 Bithynia troschelii Paasch, 1842 - synonym: Bythinia transsilvanica (E. A. Bielz, 1853)
 Bithynia tentaculata (Linnaeus, 1758)

Valvatidae
 Valvata cristata O. F. Müller, 1774
 Valvata macrostoma Mörch, 1864 - synonym: Valvata pulchella auct. nec Studer, 1820
 Valvata piscinalis (O. F. Müller, 1774)
 Borysthenia naticina (Menke, 1845)

Acroloxidae
 Acroloxus lacustris (Linnaeus, 1758)

Lymnaeidae
 Galba truncatula (O. F. Müller, 1774)
 Stagnicola corvus (Gmelin, 1791)
 Stagnicola palustris O. F. Müller, 1774 s. str. - synonym: Stagnicola turricula (Held, 1836)
 Radix ampla (Hartmann, 1821)
 Radix auricularia (Linnaeus, 1758)
 Radix ovata (Draparnaud, 1805)
 Radix peregra (O. F. Müller, 1774) s. str.
 Lymnaea stagnalis (Linnaeus, 1758)

Physidae
 Aplexa hypnorum (Linnaeus, 1758)
 Physa fontinalis (Linnaeus, 1758)
 Physella acuta (Draparnaud, 1805) - non-indigenous

Planorbidae
 Planorbis carinatus O. F. Müller, 1774
 Planorbis planorbis (Linnaeus, 1758)
 Anisus leucostoma (Millet, 1813)
 Anisus septemgyratus (Rossmässler, 1835)
 Anisus spirorbis (Linnaeus, 1758)
 Anisus vortex (Linnaeus, 1758)
 Anisus vorticulus (Troschel, 1834)
 Bathyomphalus contortus (Linnaeus, 1758)
 Gyraulus acronicus (A. Férussac, 1807)
 Gyraulus albus (O. F. Müller, 1774)
 Gyraulus crista (Linnaeus, 1758)
 Gyraulus laevis (Alder, 1838)
 Gyraulus riparius (Westerlund, 1865)
 Gyraulus rossmaessleri (Auerswald, 1852)
 Hippeutis complanatus (Linnaeus, 1758)
 Segmentina nitida (O. F. Müller, 1774)
 Planorbarius corneus (Linnaeus, 1758)
 Ancylus fluviatilis O. F. Müller, 1774
 Ferrissia fragilis (Tryon, 1863) - syn. Ferrissia clessiniana (Jickeli, 1882)

Land gastropods 
Land gastropods in Slovakia include:
Aciculidae
 Acicula parcelineata (Clessin, 1911)
 Platyla polita (Hartmann, 1840)

Ellobiidae
 Carychium minimum O. F. Müller, 1774
 Carychium tridentatum (Risso, 1826)

Cochlicopidae
 Cochlicopa lubrica (O. F. Müller, 1774)
 Cochlicopa lubricella (Rossmässler, 1835)
 Cochlicopa nitens (M. von Gallenstein, 1848)

Orculidae
 Orcula dolium (Draparnaud, 1801)
 Pagodulina pagodula (Des Moulins, 1830)
 Sphyradium doliolum (Bruguière, 1792)

Chondrinidae
 Abida secale (Draparnaud, 1801)
 Granaria frumentum (Draparnaud, 1801)
 Chondrina clienta (Westerlund, 1883)
 Chondrina tatrica Ložek, 1948

Pupillidae
 Pupilla alpicola (Charpentier, 1837)
 Pupilla muscorum (Linnaeus, 1758)
 Pupilla pratensis (Clessin, 1871)
 Pupilla sterrii (Voith, 1840)
 Pupilla triplicata (Studer, 1820)

Argnidae
 Argna bielzi (Rossmässler, 1859)

Pyramidulidae
 Pyramidula pusilla (Vallot, 1801)

Spelaeodiscidae
 Spelaeodiscus tatricus Hazay, 1883

Valloniidae
 Vallonia costata (O. F. Müller, 1774)
 Vallonia enniensis (Gredler, 1856)
 Vallonia excentrica Sterki, 1893
 Vallonia pulchella (O. F. Müller, 1774)
 Acanthinula aculeata (O. F. Müller, 1774)

Vertiginidae
 Columella aspera Waldén, 1966
 Columella columella (G. v. Martens, 1830) - only subspecies Columella columella gredleri
 Columella edentula (Draparnaud, 1805)
 Truncatellina claustralis (Gredler, 1856)
 Truncatellina costulata (Nilsson, 1823)
 Truncatellina cylindrica (A. Férussac, 1807)
 Vertigo alpestris Alder, 1838
 Vertigo angustior Jeffreys, 1830
 Vertigo antivertigo (Draparnaud, 1801)
 Vertigo geyeri Lindholm, 1925
 Vertigo modesta (Say, 1824) - synonym: Vertigo arctica (Wallenberg, 1858)
 Vertigo moulinsiana (Dupuy, 1849)
 Vertigo pusilla O. F. Müller, 1774
 Vertigo pygmaea (Draparnaud, 1801)
 Vertigo substriata (Jeffreys, 1833)

 Enidae
 Chondrula tridens (O. F. Müller, 1774) - also subspecies Chondrula tridens eximia (Rossmässler, 1837)
 Ena montana (Draparnaud, 1801)
 Merdigera obscura (O. F. Müller, 1774)
 Zebrina detrita (O. F. Müller, 1774)

 Clausiliidae
 Alopia bielzii E. A. Bielz, 1856 - only endemic subspecies Alopia bielzii clathrata (Rossmässler, 1857)
 Cochlodina cerata (Rossmässler, 1836)
 Cochlodina fimbriata (Rossmässler, 1835) - only subspecies Cochlodina fimbriata remota Ložek, 1952
 Cochlodina laminata (Montagu, 1803)
 Cochlodina orthostoma (Menke, 1828)
 Ruthenica filograna (Rossmässler, 1836)
 Pseudofusulus varians (C. Pfeiffer, 1828)
 Macrogastra borealis (O. Boettger, 1878) - synonym: Macrogastra latestriata (A. Schmidt, 1857)
 Macrogastra plicatula (Draparnaud, 1801)
 Macrogastra tumida (Rossmässler, 1836)
 Macrogastra ventricosa (Draparnaud, 1801)
 Clausilia cruciata (Studer, 1820)
 Clausilia dubia Draparnaud, 1805
 Clausilia parvula Férussac, 1807 - synonym: Clausilia rugosa parvula Férussac, 1807
 Clausilia pumila C. Pfeiffer, 1828
 Laciniaria plicata (Draparnaud, 1801)
 Balea biplicata (Montagu, 1803) - synonym: Alinda biplicata
 Pseudalinda stabilis (L. Pfeiffer, 1847)
 Balea perversa (Linnaeus, 1758)
 Vestia elata (Rossmässler, 1836)
 Vestia gulo (E. A. Bielz, 1859)
 Vestia turgida (Rossmässler, 1836)
 Bulgarica cana (Held, 1836)

Succineidae
 Succinella oblonga (Draparnaud, 1801)
 Succinea putris (Linnaeus, 1758)
 Oxyloma elegans (Risso, 1826)
 Quickella arenaria (Bouchard-Chantereaux, 1837)

Ferussaciidae
 Cecilioides acicula (O. F. Müller, 1774)
 Cecilioides petitiana (Benoit, 1862)

Punctidae
 Punctum pygmaeum (Draparnaud, 1801)

Helicodiscidae
 Lucilla scintilla (Lowe, 1852) - non-indigenous
 Lucilla singleyana (H. B. Baker, 1929) - non-indigenous

Discidae
 Discus perspectivus (Megerle von Mühlfeld, 1816)
 Discus rotundatus (O. F. Müller, 1774)
 Discus ruderatus (Férussac, 1821)

Gastrodontidae
 Zonitoides nitidus (O. F. Müller, 1774)

Euconulidae
 Euconulus praticola (Reinhardt, 1883)
 Euconulus fulvus (O. F. Müller, 1774)

Oxychilidae
 Aegopinella epipedostoma (Fagot, 1879)
 Aegopinella minor (Stabile, 1864)
 Aegopinella nitens (Michaud, 1831)
 Aegopinella pura (Alder, 1830)
 Perpolita hammonis (Ström, 1765)
 Perpolita petronella (L. Pfeiffer, 1853)
 Oxychilus cellarius (O. F. Müller, 1774)
 Oxychilus depressus (Sterki, 1880)
 Oxychilus draparnaudi (Beck, 1837)
 Oxychilus glaber (Rossmässler, 1835)
 Oxychilus hydatinus (Rossmässler 1838)
 Oxychilus inopinatus (Uličný, 1887)
 Oxychilus orientalis (Clessin, 1877)
 Daudebardia brevipes (Draparnaud, 1805)
 Daudebardia rufa (Draparnaud, 1805)
 Carpathica calophana (Westerlund, 1881)

Pristilomatidae
 Vitrea contracta (Westerlund, 1871)
 Vitrea crystallina (O. F. Müller, 1774)
 Vitrea diaphana (Studer, 1820)
 Vitrea subrimata (Reinhardt, 1871)
 Vitrea transsylvanica (Clessin, 1877)

Vitrinidae
 Vitrina pellucida (O. F. Müller, 1774)
 Eucobresia nivalis (Dumont & Mortillet, 1854)
 Semilimax kotulae Westerlund, 1883)
 Semilimax semilimax (J. Férussac, 1802)

Milacidae
 Tandonia budapestensis (Hazay, 1881)
 Tandonia kusceri  (Wagner, 1931) - non-indigenous

Limacidae
 Bielzia coerulans (M. Bielz, 1851)
 Limax cinereoniger Wolf, 1803
 Limax maximus Linnaeus, 1758
 Limacus flavus (Linnaeus, 1758)
 Malacolimax tenellus (O. F. Müller, 1774)
 Lehmannia macroflagellata Grossu & Lupu, 1962
 Lehmannia marginata (O. F. Müller, 1774)
 Lehmannia nyctelia (Bourguignat, 1861)

Agriolimacidae
 Deroceras agreste (Linnaeus, 1758)
 Deroceras fatrense Mácha, 1981
 Deroceras laeve (O. F. Müller, 1774)
 Deroceras praecox Wiktor, 1966
 Deroceras reticulatum (O. F. Müller, 1774)
 Deroceras rodnae Grossu & Lupu, 1965
 Deroceras sturanyi (Simroth, 1894)
 Deroceras turcicum (Simroth, 1894) - non-indigenous

Boettgerillidae
 Boettgerilla pallens Simroth, 1912 - non-indigenous

Arionidae
 Arion circumscriptus Johnston, 1828
 Arion distinctus Mabille, 1868
 Arion fasciatus (Nilsson, 1823)
 Arion fuscus (O. F. Müller, 1774) - synonym: Arion subfuscus (Draparnaud, 1805) part.
 Arion rufus (Linnaeus, 1758)
 Arion silvaticus Lohmander, 1937
 Arion vulgaris Moquin-Tandon, 1855 - non-indigenous

Bradybaenidae
 Fruticicola fruticum (O. F. Müller, 1774)

Helicodontidae
 Helicodonta obvoluta (O. F. Müller, 1774)

Hygromiidae
 Euomphalia strigella (Draparnaud, 1801)
 Monacha cartusiana (O. F. Müller, 1774)
 Trochulus hispidus (Linnaeus, 1758)
 Trochulus striolatus (C. Pfeiffer, 1828)
 Trochulus villosulus (Rossmässler, 1838)
 Trochulus lubomirskii (Slósarskii, 1881)
 Petasina bakowskii (Polinski, 1929)
 Petasina bielzi (A. Schmidt, 1860)
 Petasina filicina (L. Pfeiffer, 1841)
 Petasina unidentata (Draparnaud, 1805)
 Helicopsis striata (O. F. Müller, 1774)
 Candidula unifasciata (Poiret, 1801) - synonym: Candidula soosiana (J. Wagner, 1933)
 Xerolenta obvia (Menke, 1828) - synonym: Helicella candicans (L. Pfeiffer, 1841)
 Perforatella bidentata (Gmelin, 1791)
 Perforatella dibothrion (M. V. Kimakowicz, 1884)
 Monachoides incarnatus (O. F. Müller, 1774)
 Monachoides vicinus (Rossmässler, 1842)
 Pseudotrichia rubiginosa (Rossmässler, 1838)
 Urticicola umbrosus (C. Pfeiffer, 1828)
 Hygromia transsylvanica (Westerlund, 1876)

Helicidae
 Arianta arbustorum (Linnaeus, 1758)
 Faustina faustina (Rossmässler, 1835)
 Faustina rossmässleri (L. Pfeiffer, 1842) - synonym: Chilostoma rossmaessleri (L. Pfeiffer, 1842)
 Chilostoma cingulella (Rossmässler, 1837)
 Isognomostoma isognomostomos (Schröter, 1784)
 Causa holosericea (Studer, 1820)
 Cepaea hortensis (O. F. Müller, 1774)
 Cepaea vindobonensis (Férussac, 1821)
 Helix lutescens Rossmässler, 1837
 Helix pomatia Linnaeus, 1758

Freshwater bivalves
Freshwater bivalves in Slovakia include:
Unionidae
 Unio crassus Philipsson, 1788
 Unio pictorum (Linnaeus, 1758)
 Unio tumidus Philipsson, 1788
 Anodonta anatina (Linnaeus, 1758)
 Anodonta cygnea (Linnaeus, 1758)
 Pseudanodonta complanata (Rossmässler, 1835)
 Sinanodonta woodiana (Lea, 1834) - non-indigenous

Corbiculidae
 Corbicula fluminea (O. F. Müller, 1774) - non-indigenous

Sphaeriidae
 Sphaerium corneum (Linnaeus, 1758) s. lat.
 Sphaerium rivicola (Lamarck, 1818)
 Sphaerium solidum (Normand, 1844)
 Sphaerium nucleus (Studer, 1820)
 Musculium lacustre (O. F. Müller, 1774)
 Pisidium amnicum (O. F. Müller, 1774)
 Pisidium casertanum (Poli, 1791)
 Pisidium henslowanum (Sheppard, 1823)
 Pisidium hibernicum Westerlund, 1894
 Pisidium globulare (Clessin, 1873)
 Pisidium milium Held, 1836
 Pisidium moitessierianum Paladilhe, 1866
 Pisidium nitidum Jenyns, 1832
 Pisidium obtusale (Lamarck, 1818)
 Pisidium personatum Malm, 1855
 Pisidium pseudosphaerium Favre, 1927
 Pisidium subtruncatum Malm, 1855
 Pisidium supinum A. Schmidt, 1851
 Pisidium tenuilineatum Stelfox, 1918

Dreissenidae
 Dreissena polymorpha (Pallas, 1771)

Synanthropic molluscs
These 9 species do not live in the wild or are not recorded in the wild yet, but they live in greenhouses and similar biotopes as "hothouse alien" species. All 9 of them are gastropods.

List (alphabetically according to scientific name):
 Deroceras panormitanum (Lessona et Pollonera, 1882)
 Gulella io
 Lehmannia valentiana
 Melanoides tuberculata
 Opeas pumilum
 Planorbella duryi
 Pomacea bridgesii
 Pseudosuccinea columella
 Zonitoides arboreus

See also
Undescribed species of Slovakia include Hauffenia sp. nov. (not counted in this list).

Lists of molluscs of surrounding countries:
 List of non-marine molluscs of the Czech Republic
 List of non-marine molluscs of Poland
 List of non-marine molluscs of Ukraine
 List of non-marine molluscs of Austria
 List of non-marine molluscs of Hungary

References

External links

 Horsák M., Čejka T., Juřičková L., Beran L., Horáčková J., Hlaváč J. Č.,  Dvořák L., Hájek O., Maňas M. & Ložek V. (2015). "Check-list and distribution maps of the molluscs of the Czech and Slovak Republics". http://mollusca.sav.sk/malacology/checklist.htm

Molluscs
Molluscs
Slovak
Slovakia
Slovak